Gentil Montaña (1942–2011), born in Ibagué, was a classical guitarist and composer from Colombia.
He was the director of the Fundación Gentil Montaña.

Compositions
Most notable among his compositions are five suites for guitar which include several popular Colombian dances such as the Bambuco, Guabina and Porro, as well as other Latin American dances such as the Cancion.

Recordings

Montaña plays Montaña Vol.1 (rec. 2005 Caroni Music)

External links
Homepage - http://www.gentilmontana.org/
 Fundacion Gentil Montaña
Biography
 Documentary on maestro Gentil Montaña (from Biblioteca Nacional, Colombia)
Obituary in Spanish, El Pais
 Obituary in Spanish, Caracol Radio, Colombia 
La Suite Colombiana No 1 para guitarra de Gentil Montaña (1942-2011): análisis de sus ediciones y contextualización de la obra de un compositor colombiano

Colombian classical guitarists
Colombian composers
Male composers
Composers for the classical guitar
1942 births
2011 deaths